Kim Hyeon-jun (김현준) may refer to:
 Kim Hyun-jun (1960–1999), South Korean basketball player
 Kim Hyun-joon (born 1987), South Korean tennis player
 Dimo Hyun Jun Kim (born 1991), South Korean musical theatre director
 Kim Hyeon-jun (born 1992), South Korean sports shooter